is a passenger railway station in the city of Moriya, Ibaraki Prefecture, Japan operated by the private railway company Kantō Railway.

Lines

Station layout
The station consists of a single elevated island platform with the station building underneath. The station has been unstaffed since February 2010.

Platforms

Adjacent stations

History
Minami-Moriya Station opened on 15 November 1960.

Passenger statistics
In fiscal 2017, the station was used by an average of 2426 passengers daily.

Surrounding area
Moriya-Izumino Post Office
Ibaraki New Town Minami-Moriya

See also
 List of railway stations in Japan

References

External links

  

Railway stations in Ibaraki Prefecture
Railway stations in Japan opened in 1960
Moriya, Ibaraki